David Butler or Dave Butler may refer to:

Sports
David Butler (basketball, born 1966), American basketball player who played in college for the UNLV Runnin' Rebels
David Butler (footballer, born 1945), professional footballer in England
David Butler (footballer, born 1953), professional footballer in England and the United States
David Butler (footballer, born 1962), professional footballer in England
David Butler (hurler) (born 1992), Irish hurler
David Butler (wrestler) (born 1957), American Olympic wrestler
Dave Butler (basketball, born 1964/1965),  American basketball player who played in college for the California Golden Bears

Entertainment
David Butler (author) (born 1964), Irish author, playwright and poet
David Butler (director) (1894–1979), American filmmaker, screenwriter and actor
David Butler (screenwriter) (1927–2006), British writer of screenplays and teleplays
David John Butler, who writes under D. J. Butler and Dave Butler, American writer

Other
David Butler (general) (1928–2020), Australian Army officer
David Butler (politician) (1829–1891), American politician, governor of the state of Nebraska
Sir David Butler (psephologist) (1924–2022), British social scientist and psephologist
David Butler (sculptor) (1898–1997), American sculptor and painter

See also
David Butler-Jones, Canadian physician and Canada's first (2004) Chief Public Health Officer
Alan David Butler (1927–1972), Rhodesian sailor, businessman and politician
David W. Butler High School, American school
Butler (surname)